The Wadi Sawawin mine is a small mine by World standards but larger by Saudi standards located in the west of Saudi Arabia in Al Madinah Province. Wadi Sawawin represents one of the largest iron reserve in Saudi Arabia having estimated reserves of 383 million tonnes of ore grading 40% iron.

References

See also 

 Maaden (company)

Iron mines in Saudi Arabia